Vintage design refers to an item of another era that holds important and recognizable value. This style can be applied to interior design, decor, clothing and other areas. Vintage design is popular and vintage items have risen in price. Outlets of vintage design have shifted from thrift store to shabby chic stores.

Terminology
There is debate over what determines if an item is vintage. Some rely on the definition of anything old and of value.  The most widely accepted definition used by antique and vintage professionals is anything older than 40, (and less than 100,) years old. 

The terms vintage, retro, and antique are oftentimes used interchangeably and have some overlay, however the words possess different meanings. Retro refers to a style iconic of a previous era. Vintage generally refers to an item of high-quality materials and/or craftmanship, that is characteristic of a specific time period or artist, and is between 40 and 100 years old. 
Lastly, antique refers to an item of the previous era or at least 100 years old. A related term is antiquity, which indicates something of past eras, or simply put, ancient.
The word vintage originated in Late Middle English from Old French and Latin origins.

Popularity

Vintage items spark interest in many. The United States Department of Labor tells us that, "Design and fashion trends play an important part in the production of furniture. The integrated design of the article for both esthetic and functional qualities is also a major part of the process of manufacturing furniture."

The popularity of vintage design and vintage inspired items can be seen through media. In 2004 designer Nicolas Ghesquière created a line for Balenciaga which called back to older collections. Tom Ford's collection for her also uses references to the past. Vintage design can also be seen in ads which promote vintage inspired clothing.

There are several reasons for vintage design's popularity. Some claim the phenomenon is due to the rarity and classic value of the items. Others state the reason to be a mixture of peoples' nostalgia creating a positive emotional appeal toward a past era or their childhood, consumers' environmental concerns, an appreciation of past styles and craftsmanship, and other experience.

Subcategories
Vintage design contains various subcategories reflecting the vast diversity of aesthetics that make up traditional and 20th century design styles.

Art Nouveau
Art Nouveau is a style containing curved lines, flowers and other plants, contrasting colors, ornate colors, young women, and intricate details. It was created at the end of the 1800s and gained popularity at the start of the 1910s.

Art Deco
Art Deco was created to intentionally embrace a clean, modern, and man-made look, developed and popular from the 1920s and reaching its peak in the 1930s. This style features mostly geometric shapes, symmetrical patterns, and idealized human figures.

Mid-century modern
Mid-century modern style makes use of straight, clear lines, curved objects, wood tones, thin supporting, and oversized objects. It is meant to call back to the mid-20th century.

Atomic Age
Referring to the period roughly corresponding to 1940–1963, the Atomic Age includes elements of space exploration, scientific discovery, and futurism, creating an idea of an "optimistic, modern world". Atomic Age design became popular and instantly recognizable, with a use of atomic motifs and space age symbols.

International Style
International Style design contains broad block letters in fonts such as Helvetica (see Swiss Style for further information on the typographic style) and sleek, modern lines invoking Mies-ian simplicity and a cosmopolitan aire.

Seventies
The styles of the 1970s are incredibly popular in vintage design, recalling the aesthetics of hippies and other counterculture groups of the era. Use of natural color combinations such as the well-known 'harvest gold, avocado green, and burnt orange' was widespread, as were psychedelic colors and designs such as paisley.

Punk
The punk counterculture style of the late 1970s and 1980s is reused today. It contains harsh lines, clashing colors, juxtaposition, and 'edgy' imagery to create an anti-authoritarian aesthetic.

Postmodernism
Postmodernism as a style incorporates bold colors and abstract geometric motifs with intentionally humorous references to past architectural and design traditions, popular in the 1980s and 1990s. Whereas 'less is more' was a tenet of modernism, postmodern architect Robert Venturi quipped 'less is a bore'. Postmodernism has heavily influenced the vaporwave aesthetic.

See also
 Vintage clothing
 Cottagecore
 Retro style

References 

Design
Cultural trends
Antiques 
Retro style
Collecting
Nostalgia